Selikhino is a rural locality (a selo) in Komsomolsky District of Khabarovsk Krai, Russia. Population:

Geography
Selikhino is located by lake Khummi, on the Baikal-Amur Mainline railway, shortly after the railway leaves Komsomolsk-on-Amur towards Sovetskaya Gavan.

History
Selikhino was the junction station for a railway built in the early 1950s by the Soviet Union under Joseph Stalin, intended to link to a tunnel to the island of Sakhalin. Construction of the tunnel was abandoned after Stalin's death; however, the railway had already been built as far as Chyorny Mys; this section was kept open for logging industry traffic until the 1990s.

References

Rural localities in Khabarovsk Krai